is a 1979 romance film from Japan starring Momoe Yamaguchi, Tomokazu Miura, and Bunjaku Han. It was directed by Tsugunobu Kotani and filmed in Spain.

It was the second of the Yamaguchi-Miura "golden combi"'s films shot outside Japan and also the second based on an original script rather than a literary work.

References

External links
 
JMDB

1979 films
Films shot in Spain
1970s romance films
Japanese romance films
Films directed by Tsugunobu Kotani
1970s Japanese films